Lifejackets is the second album by Danish based indie rock band Mimas. It was produced by original keyboardist Kenn Hedegaard Eskildsen.

Track listing

Personnel
Mimas
 Snævar Njáll Albertsson - vocals/guitar/trumpet
 Daniel Beck - guitar
 Lasse Christensen - drums
 Gert Hoberg Jørgensen - bass/backing vocals

References

External links 
Official website

2010 albums
Big Scary Monsters Recording Company albums